Dwarf furze is a common name for several plants in the genus Ulex and may refer to:

Ulex gallii, which is also called western gorse
Ulex minor